Epicephala periplecta is a moth of the family Gracillariidae. It is known from New Guinea.

References

Epicephala
Moths described in 1955